Ismajli is an Albanian Kosovar surname that may refer to
Adelina Ismajli (born 1979), Albanian Kosovar singer, actress, and beauty pageant
Ardian Ismajli (born 1996), Albanian Kosovar football defender 
Emin Ismajli (born 1982), Albanian football defender 
Genta Ismajli (born 1984), Albanian Kosovar singer-songwriter and actress

Albanian-language surnames
Patronymic surnames
Surnames from given names